The canton of Ribiers is a former administrative division in southeastern France. It was disbanded following the French canton reorganisation which came into effect in March 2015. It consisted of 7 communes, which joined the canton of Laragne-Montéglin in 2015. It had 1,795 inhabitants (2012).

The canton comprised the following communes:
Antonaves
Barret-sur-Méouge
Châteauneuf-de-Chabre
Éourres
Ribiers
Saint-Pierre-Avez
Salérans

Demographics

See also
Cantons of the Hautes-Alpes department

References

Former cantons of Hautes-Alpes
2015 disestablishments in France
States and territories disestablished in 2015